Brayan Edinson Angulo Mosquera (born 19 July 1993) is a professional Colombian football midfielder who plays for Once Caldas.

Career
On 24 January 2020, Angulo signed permanently for Pafos from Independiente Medellín having previously played for the club during the 2018-19 season.

Club statistics

Honours

Club
América
Categoría Primera B: 2016

References

External links

1993 births
Living people
Footballers from Cali
Colombian footballers
Colombian expatriate footballers
Association football midfielders
Cypriot First Division players
Categoría Primera A players
Categoría Primera B players
Latvian Higher League players
Deportivo Cali footballers
Cortuluá footballers
Águilas Doradas Rionegro players
Independiente Medellín footballers
Deportivo Pasto footballers
América de Cali footballers
Pafos FC players
Riga FC players
Once Caldas footballers
Colombian expatriate sportspeople in Cyprus
Colombian expatriate sportspeople in Latvia
Expatriate footballers in Cyprus
Expatriate footballers in Latvia